Palaivana Solai may refer to:
  Palaivana Solai (1981 film), a Tamil film directed by Robert–Rajasekar
  Palaivana Solai (2009 film), a Tamil film directed by K. S. Dayalan